Elections to Burnley Borough Council in Lancashire, England were held on 3 May 2012.  One third of the council was up for election and the Labour Party regained control of the council, with Julie Cooper becoming council leader. Also the last remaining British National Party councillor, Sharon Wilkinson, lost the Hapton with Park seat, a decade since the far-right group were first elected to the council

After the election, the composition of the council was
Labour 26
Liberal Democrat 14
Conservative 5
British National Party 0

Election result

Ward Results

References

2012 English local elections
2012
2010s in Lancashire